The Medical University of Plovdiv is a state higher medical school, accredited by the National Evaluation and Accreditation Agency, with the aim of training and upgrading the qualifications of specialists in the fields of medicine, dentistry, pharmacy, public health and health care. MU of Plovdiv carries out the following training in these professional fields:
-	training of students in the "master's", "bachelor's", "professional bachelor's“ educational and qualification degrees; 
 
-	training in the educational and scientific degree "doctor“;

-	postgraduate training and specialization for physicians, doctors of dental medicine, other medical and non-medical health professionals;

-	scientific research activity, advisory, expert and medical activity;

-	international cooperation in education and science.

The structural units of MU of Plovdiv are as follows: Faculty of Medicine, Faculty of Dental Medicine, Faculty of Pharmacy, Faculty of Public Health, Department of Languages and Specialized Training and Medical College.

In its activities, the Medical University of Plovdiv complies with and is guided by the current Higher Education Act, Law for the Development of Academic Staff in the Republic of Bulgaria and is in accordance with the legislation of the Republic of Bulgaria. 

The structure, activities, organization and management of the Medical University of Plovdiv reflect the mission, vision and main goal adopted by the academic community, guided by the main values affirmed by the University.

The public mission of the Medical University of Plovdiv is to contribute to the implementation of the state policy for the development of higher medical education and medical science, health care and improving the health status of the population. 

The vision for the development of Medical University of Plovdiv is aimed at turning it into a model academic institution with high research capacity and a leader among medical universities in Bulgaria by: 
-	providing high quality training, meeting European educational standards;

-	attainment of high scientific achievements, providing for the best career development of the academic staff; 

-	modernization and optimal use of technology centres and educational, diagnostic and research infrastructure and equipment;
 
-	moral and material improvement of the working environment;

-	intellectual motivation and stimulation of students and teachers. 

The main aim of the Medical University of Plovdiv is the training of highly qualified specialists with higher medical education, capable of applying and developing scientific medical knowledge and skills in all areas of medical practice and healthcare. The university is an innovative research and educational centre that has gathered the experience of generations of doctors and teachers, which gives meaning to the motto of MU of Plovdiv - „Dedicated to humanity“.

The main values, affirmed by MU of Plovdiv are: objectivity and tolerance; innovation and creativity; openness, criticality, responsibility and respect; philanthropy.

History

The Medical University of Plovdiv was established as the Faculty of Medicine at the Plovdiv University in 1945. The faculty was disjoined under the name of the Plovdiv Medical Academy in 1950 and a little later received the name of the notable Russian scientist, Nobel Laureate Ivan Petrovich Pavlov as its patron.

The Medical Academy was renamed the Higher Medical Institute in 1955. In 1972, HMI was incorporated in the structure of the united Medical Academy.  In 1990 it became independent again. On the 22nd of February 2002 the Higher Medical Institute was renamed the Medical University by decision of the National Assembly. 

1974 - the Faculty of Dentistry was established 

1997 - the Medical College was included in the structure of HMI.

2000 - as part of the European orientation and vision of MU of Plovdiv, the Department of Languages and Specialized Training (DLST) was established by decision of the Academic Council. 

2002 - Medical University of Plovdiv became an independent educational structure and acquired the status of an autonomous university, officially and finally disjoining it from the university hospital. 

2006 - the Faculty of Pharmacy was established as a main unit in the structure of the Medical University by a decision of the National Assembly.

2006 - a new independent building was officially inaugurated where the Faculty of Dentistry, renamed the Faculty of Dental Medicine, was relocated.

2007 - by decision of the Academic Council, the Faculty of Public Health (FPH) was established it was then institutionally legitimized as a main unit of MU of Plovdiv by decision of the National Assembly of the Republic of Bulgaria. 

Since 2012 Medical University of Plovdiv has been a member of the European University Association (EUA).
In 2015, the Medical Simulation Training Centre (MSTC) of MU of Plovdiv was established as the only medical training complex of its kind in Bulgaria. The MSTC is among the best in Europe, has the latest virtual reality simulators, as well as a virtual operating room. It was accredited by the American Association for Surgery in 2018. 

2019 - the Research Institute of MU of Plovdiv was established by a Decree of the Council of Ministers.

In 2021 The Ministry of Education and Culture awarded MU of Plovdiv the status of a research university. The university is one of the seven higher education institutions in Bulgaria having this status, introduced in the Law on Higher Education in 2020. It is awarded for significant contribution to the development of important public areas through top scientific research and high results of scientific research activity, evaluated according to objective indicators.

Rectors 

1945 - 1946 - Prof. Dr. Georgi YANKOV - rector of PU

1945 – 1946 - Prof. Dr. Petar NIKOLOV, first dean of the Medical faculty.

1946 – 1947 - Prof. Dr. Tsvetan KRISTANOV

1946 – 1947 - Prof. Dr. Bogoya YURUKOV

1947 – 1948 - Academician Hristo DASKALOV, rector of PU

1947 – 1948 - Prof. Dr. Mikhail RASHEV

1948 – 1950 - Associate Professor Dr. Stefan DIMITROV

1950 – 1953 - Prof. Dr. Elisey YANEV, first rector of HMI-Plovdiv

1953 – 1957 - Prof. Dr. Zhivko LAMBREV

1957 – 1964 - Prof. Dr. Todor ZACHARIEV

1964 – 1966 - Prof. Dr. Anton MITOV

1966 – 1973 - Prof. Dr. Peyu MISHEV

1973 – 1977 - Prof. Dr. Ivan TOLEV, Dean of the Medical faculty at the MA

1979 – 1981 - Prof. Dr. Vuko MITKOV

1981 – 1985 - Prof. Dr. Konstantin TSONEV

1985 – 1989 - Prof. Dr. Lubomir GRIGOROV

1989 – 1991 - Prof. Dr. Petar BOTUSHANOV

1991 – 1995 - Prof. Dr. Panayot SOLAKOV

1995 – 2003 - Prof. Dr. Atanas DJURDJEV

2003 – 2011 - Assoc. Dr. Georgi PASKALEV

2011 – 2019 – Corresponding member Prof. Dr. Stefan KOSTIANEV

2019 - to date: Prof. Dr. Marianna MURDJEVA

Governance
The governing bodies of the Medical University - Plovdiv are the General Assembly, the Academic Council, and the Rector. The governing bodies of the higher education institution are elected for a four-year term.
The Control Board, the Board of Trustees and the University Quality Management Board also function as interaction and control bodies.

Academic symbols of MU of Plovdiv

The coat of arms of the Medical University of Plovdiv combines several main symbols of the higher school. In the centre of the composition is the staff of Asclepius - a symbol of healers and the medical profession, located in the general frame of an open book, which represents the transmission of knowledge and the development of science. The book is flanked by two lions, representing strength, courage and justice. The composition features the two most characteristic symbols of the city of Plovdiv - the seven hills at the top, depicted in the form of a crown, associated with the sustainability and stability of the University and the city and at the base, the Maritsa River, forever moving and changing, is symbolically illustrated. 

The flag of the Medical University of Plovdiv is made of silk with golden tinsel braid on a burgundy background with the coat of arms of the University. The burgundy colour is the institutional colour of MU of Plovdiv and symbolizes the love, perseverance, and dedication to the profession of the graduates of the higher school. The golden colour symbolizes sincerity, faith, and high morals, which are the main values of MU of Plovdiv and are embedded in the education of every student. 

The motto of Medical University of Plovdiv is „Dedicated to humanity “(„Ad humanitatem dedicati“).

The rector's toga is in the institutional colour of burgundy with black edging. The rector's necklace is round, the coat of arms of the university is engraved in the centre of the medallion.

The dean's toga is black in colour with burgundy edging. The dean's necklace is round and the coats of arms of the respective faculties are engraved in the centre of the medallion.

The anthem of the Medical University of Plovdiv was created after a competition in 2020. Antoaneta Pavlova - a teacher at DLST is the author of the text and the music is by the composer Ivaylo Kanev.

The song of the students of the Medical University of Plovdiv was chosen after a competition in 2020. Corresponding member Prof. Dr. Stefan Kostianev is the author of the text and music, arrangement is by Diana Komitova.

Awards and honours

Awards and honours are awarded by Medical University of Plovdiv
Determined by a decision of the Academic Council of the Medical University of Plovdiv:

Honorary title "Doctor Honoris Causa" of MU of Plovdiv with a diploma. The title is awarded to scientists and heads of foreign and Bulgarian higher schools and scientific institutes, for contributions to international activity and cooperation with MU of Plovdiv. It is also awarded to distinguished Bulgarian state and public figures, teachers and scientists who contributed to the development and prestige of the University.

The following honours are determined by decision of the Rector's Council of the Medical University of Plovdiv:

Badge of honour. It is awarded to long-term employees and governors for personal contribution to the establishment and development of the university.

Plaque of honour. It is awarded to public figures and health officials for positive contribution and attitude towards MU of Plovdiv, as well as to long-term employees of the university for teaching, diagnostic and consulting activity. 

"Golden Hippocrates" plaque with diploma. The award is given to students who graduated with full honours (semester and state exams) in the Faculty of Medicine and the Faculty of Dentistry. The first recipient of the Golden Hippocrates, graduated in 1979, is corresponding member. Prof. Dr. Stefan Kostianev, 

"Golden Galen" plaque with diploma. The award is given to students who graduated with full honours (semester and state exams) at the Faculty of Pharmacy of MU of Plovdiv.

Honours and rating of Medical University of Plovdiv

Accredited with one of the highest marks by the National Evaluation and Accreditation Agency for (NEAA), the University is among the leaders in medical education in our country, ranking first in training in the professional field of "Medicine" for five consecutive years (2018, 2019, 2020, 2021, 2022) according to the Rating System of Higher Schools in Bulgaria.   

The Medical University of Plovdiv is among the seven higher education institutions in the country that received the status of a research university in 2021 as an assessment of the University's significant contribution to the development of important public areas through top scientific research and high research results. The modernized scientific infrastructure is an additional condition for the increased activity of the research staff and for performing cutting-edge research focused on the transfer of knowledge and technology into practice. MU-Plovdiv has developed a Strategic Innovative Research Program until 2026, which will be financed within the framework of the Recovery and Sustainability Plan. 

The Medical University of Plovdiv is also the first medical university given a certificate for quality under the ISO-9001:2008 standard, received in 2009. 
Medical University of Plovdiv is the first higher medical institution that initiated and achieved the introduction of a single effective and efficient Quality Management System (QMS) at all levels of the "higher medical education" service offered. MU of Plovdiv has been certified under the ISO-9001 standard ever since the first certification in 2009.
The university publishes its own scientific medical and biological journal called Folia medica, the only Bulgarian journal in English, indexed in Medicus/MEDLINE, referenced in PubMed  continuously since 1965. Folia medica is the only Bulgarian medical scientific journal indexed and referenced in the Scopus International Scientific Information Database continuously since 1964.

Medical University of Plovdiv is the initiator and organizer of the First National Festival of Medical University Students.

Structure

The structure of the Medical University of Plovdiv incorporates 6 main units: Faculty of Medicine, Faculty of Dental Medicine, Faculty of Pharmacy, Faculty of Public Health, Department of Languages and Specialized Training and the Medical College. 

The Scientific Research Institute of MU of Plovdiv (RIMU-Plovdiv); Professional Training Centre (PTC); Centre for Electronic and Distance Learning (CEDL) are among the main units in the structure of MU of Plovdiv.

Faculty of Medicine        

The Faculty of Medicine was established in 1945, from which the Higher Medical Institute was later established, and subsequently its successor, the Medical University of Plovdiv. 

Training is full-time only and lasts 6 years and is carried out in Bulgarian and in English according to a curriculum and syllabi approved by the Faculty Council, in accordance with the uniform state requirements. Students are given the opportunity to choose from 27 elective courses to add to their credits from year one to year six. 

In addition to the modern base for theoretical training, which includes new and state-of-the-art classrooms, the students of the Faculty of Medicine use 6 university hospitals as bases for practical training, in which all specialties are augmented with modern high-tech diagnostic and therapeutic units equipped with conventional and unique equipment. As of 2022, the medical institutions with "university" status are the largest Plovdiv hospitals: “St. George” University hospital, University hospital “Plovdiv”, University hospital “Pulmed“,University hospital “Caspela”, University hospital “Eurohospital“, and Specialized University hospital for treatment in obstetrics and gynaecology “Selena”. 

The achievements of the Faculty of Medicine of MU of Plovdiv are recognized in the high assessment received by NEAA for program accreditation of the "Medicine" specialty with an overall assessment according to the criteria of 9.5, as well as in the Rating System of Higher Schools in Bulgaria. Medical education at the Faculty of Medicine of the Medical University of Plovdiv has been awarded first place among the medical faculties in Bulgaria for five consecutive years (2018, 2019, 2020, 2021, 2022).

Faculty of Dental Medicine

The Dentistry specialty was initiated at the Higher Medical Institute in Plovdiv in 1970 by an act of the Council of Ministers of the Republic of Bulgaria. In 1974, the Faculty of Dentistry was established as an independent educational and medical unit of HMI. Since October 2006, the Faculty of Dentistry has been housed in a new and modern building located at the foot of the Mladezhki Hill. 

In 2012 training in English in the Dental Medicine specialty was introduced following successful curriculum accreditation by NEAA. Currently, 1,300 students are being trained at FDM – 800 of which in Bulgarian-language training and 500 in the English-language training programme.

The educational process in the special disciplines is carried out by 8 departments. The faculty has excellently equipped and completely renovated lecture, phantom, pre-clinical and clinical rooms at its disposal. Since 2019, "Base 2" has been opened at the Faculty of Dental Medicine, equipped with modern equipment for training students in "Dental Medicine", doctoral students and specialists. The faculty has the following centres: "Laser", "CAD/CAM", "3D printing" and "Implantology", which are part of RIMU of Plovdiv.

Since 2018, the Faculty of Dentistry, together with the Regional College of the Bulgarian Dental Union of Plovdiv, has been organizing a Scientific Congress "Science and Practice - Hand in Hand", which includes dentists from all over the country.

Since 2020, the "Podem" Centre for continuous education of dental doctors through courses and lectures has been established at the Faculty of Dental Medicine.

Faculty of Pharmacy
                 
Training of master pharmacists at the Medical University started in 2003 with а state quota of 30 students. At the end of 2005, after accreditation by the National Evaluation and Accreditation Agency, the specialty received a very good rating. By decision of the National Assembly of the Republic of Bulgaria dated 15.03.2006, the Faculty of Pharmacy was established as a main unit in the structure of the Medical University of Plovdiv. On 24.05.2008, the building of the Faculty of Pharmacy was inaugurated (former Clinic of Obstetrics and Gynaecology). 

Since the 2016/2017 academic year, the Faculty has been teaching pharmacy students in English. The faculty is also a base for postgraduate qualification of specialists and participates in the continuous education of master pharmacists.

In 2021, a Pharmaceutical Simulation Centre was opened at the Faculty.  It consists of two teaching laboratories: Pharmacy SimLab and Pharmacy SkillsLab. SimLab is a hybrid pharmacy simulation that includes a demonstration and virtual pharmacy equipped with computer hardware and software for training in key competencies and skills for providing pharmaceutical care. SkillsLab is a laboratory for building practical and soft skills such as communication, cooperation and teamwork, problem solving, creativity, integrity, empathy, etc.

More than 800 students’ study at the Faculty of Pharmacy, 125 of them are foreign citizens from countries such as Greece, Turkey, Great Britain, Serbia, Macedonia, etc.

The faculty has 14 accredited doctoral programs.

Faculty of Public Health
          
The Faculty of Public Health (FPH) was established by decision of the Academic Council of MU of Plovdiv in 2007 and institutionally legitimized by decision of the National Assembly of the Republic of Bulgaria in 2009. The faculty unites 8 departments and prepares personnel with higher education in three bachelor's and five master's accredited specialties: health care management; public health and health management; management of medical and social activities and public health; rehabilitation, wellness, spa and balneotherapy; nursing; midwifery and physician assistants.

The Faculty of Public Health has modern classrooms with over 300 seats, computer rooms and study rooms that meet educational standards. 

The Faculty is a member of ASPHER (Association of Schools of Public Health in the European Region). The academic staff of the Faculty of Public Health are members of a number of international and European professional organizations.

Department of Languages and Specialized Training

The Department of Languages and Specialized Training (DLST) was established in 2000 by decision of the Academic Council. It includes the Bulgarian Language Section, the Foreign Languages Section and the Natural Sciences Section. As a main structural unit, it was created in order to provide training in Bulgarian language and basic biology knowledge for foreign students, as well as specialized and foreign language training for Bulgarian students, PhD students, specialists, and tutors. With a focus on mastering the specialized "language of medicine", the Department provides: 

 training in Latin with medical terminology, English, German, and French for students from the four faculties of MU of Plovdiv;

 mastering the Bulgarian language for general and medical purposes by foreign students of medicine, dentistry, and pharmacy at the MU of Plovdiv and the Medical College;

 language preparation (in Bulgarian or English) and optimization of the basic knowledge of biology, chemistry, and physics of foreign students in the preparatory course;

 specialized foreign language training for PhD students, specialists, and teachers;

 optional foreign language courses and elective lecture courses ("Philosophical Anthropology", "Medical Communication “);

 Bulgarian language courses for foreign students under the Erasmus+ program“;

 production of textbooks and teaching aids, supporting teaching in the DLST;

 proofreading, editing and translation work for the needs of MU of Plovdiv;

 promotion of Bulgarian culture among foreign students by organizing various events.

DLST upgrades the language skills of the teachers and students of MU of Plovdiv by providing optional language courses with an emphasis on specialized terminology.

Medical College

Plovdiv Medical College, as a higher state health educational institution, is a main unit in the structure of the Medical University of Plovdiv.

The modern-day Medical College is the legal successor of the second in Bulgaria "Sisters of Mercy school” (1942) and the Medical School for Midwives (1945), which in 1954 merged into the United Medical School.  

In its history, the school has gone through transformations; it has repeatedly changed its status:

1942 – Medical School for Nurses

1945 – Medical School for Midwives

1958 - Medical School for Nurses, Medical assistants and Midwives

1975 - Medical junior college 

1980 – Vocational Institute for healthcare personnel 

1983 - Vocational Institute for healthcare personnel with educational and professional complex

1990 - Medical junior college

Since 1997 - Medical college as part of HMI in Plovdiv.

Centres

Medical Simulation Training Centre (MSTC)
  
Functional Pulmonary Diagnostics Centre

Immunology Research Center 

Translational Neuroscience Complex

Library and information Centre	

University Publishing Centre

Career Centre

Project Centre

Professional Training Centre

Child Development Research Centre

Morphological Research Centre

Centre for Continuous Education in Dental Medicine (PODEM)

Laser Dental medicine Centre

Dental Implantology Centre

CAD/CAM Dental medicine Centre

Centre of competence "Personalized Innovative Medicine PERIMED"

Electronic Distance Learning Centre

Centre for electronic and distance learning

Academic Development Centre

Data Centre.

Research Institute of MU of Plovdiv (RIMU) 

Research Institute of MU of Plovdiv (RIMU) works in several priority scientific areas: simulation-training technologies in medicine, translational neuroscience, molecular and regenerative medicine, 3D bioprinting, innovative diagnostic methods, child development, medical speech and language pathology, patient safety in surgery, modern technologies in dental medicine, pharmaceutical innovations for personalized medicine, health and quality of life in a green and sustainable environment, etc. Priority is given to scientific applied research, the results of which have practical value for the general public.

Training

Specialties

Students, PhD students and specialists in the fields of medicine, dentistry and health care at the Medical University of Plovdiv are trained in the following master's and bachelor's programs:

 Medicine, Dental Medicine, Pharmacy (Master’s) – full-time, following exams in biology and chemistry. 

 Nurse, Midwife, Physician Assistant (Bachelor’s) – full-time, following an exam in ethics; 

 Assistant pharmacist, Medical laboratory technician, Radiographer, Rehabilitator, Dental Technician, Public Health Inspector, Nutrition Instructor, Medical Cosmetics (Professional Bachelor’s) – Full-time, following an exam in ethics; for the dental technician specialty –following an additional exam in sculpting.

 Healthcare management (Bachelor’s and Master’s) – full-time and part-time studies, following an exam in social medicine and health management. 

 Public Health and Health Management, Management of Medico-Social Activities and Public Health, Rehabilitation, Wellness, Spa and Balneotherapy (Master’s) – part-time study, after a completed higher education, following an exam in social medicine and health management.

 Medical speech and language pathology (Master’s) - full-time, following completed higher education.

The diplomas issued by the Medical University of Plovdiv are recognized by all member countries of the European Union and the European Economic Area.

International and project activity

The international activity of the Medical University of Plovdiv is among the main activities expressing and developing the potential of the academic staff while improving the international image of the University even further.

International Cooperation

International cooperation activities are in the field of international partnerships and forums.  These include institutional preparation, participation, implementation and reporting of international and national scientific, infrastructure project lines, educational programs and international exchange for students and doctoral students, as well as academic staff. Permanent international academic exchange within and outside the Erasmus+ program through external mobilities and internships is carried out and coordinated. Logistics and coordination of international conferences, official visits of ambassadors, visiting foreign lecturers and teachers, holding of scientific forums, participation of MU of Plovdiv in established international networks and organizations are ensured. 

The Medical University of Plovdiv is part of 30 active academic agreements and memoranda, 133 inter-institutional memoranda with 120 higher education institutions from 25 program included countries, 4 new and in the process of being concluded academic memoranda for cooperation with Lincoln Memorial University, European University R. Macedonia, Lega Italiana per la Lotta Contro I Tumori, Samarkand State Medical Institute, 15 international academic organizations, 2 international networks and 4 active academic exchange programs – OMI, CEEPUS, FULBRIGHT, EUA.

International programs and projects

The international programs and projects section is active in programs with EU funding such as Erasmus+ - KA 1,2,3 and "Horizon Europe", "Marie Curie", COST, EIT, etc. project lines. Preparation, coordination and writing of international projects is carried out, as well as administration of already won projects, following their entire life cycle - from concept development, writing a project proposal, administration, coordination and reporting of the project, as well as activities in partnership with other university structures, such as developing strategies for publicity, legal support and accounting. New project opportunities are constantly explored in connection with the academic fields developed at MU of Plovdiv. 

Some of the currently active projects are: iHelp (with 15 international partners, Horizon 2020), Idea to Impact (with 15 international partners, Horizon 2020).

Students

Student profile

More than 6,000 students from 66 countries from all continents are studying in 10 bachelor's and 5 master's programs (January 2022) at the Medical University of Plovdiv. Foreign students account for 60.40% of all students in Medicine, 43.80% in Dental medicine and 14.8% in Pharmacy.   

Our foreign students come from Europe (Austria, Albania, Belgium, Great Britain, Germany, Greece, Denmark, Ireland, Spain, Italy, Cyprus, Kosovo, Latvia, Moldova, Norway, Poland, Portugal, Russia, North Macedonia, Slovenia, Serbia, Ukraine , Finland, France, Netherlands, Czech Republic, Switzerland, Sweden), Australia and New Zealand, Asia (Afghanistan, Vietnam, Bangladesh, Bhutan, Israel, India, Iraq, Iran, Jordan, China, Malaysia, Nepal, Lebanon, Pakistan, Syria , Turkey, Uzbekistan, Sri Lanka, Japan), North America (Canada, USA) and Africa (Morocco, Nigeria, Seychelles, Republic of South Africa).

Student organizations

Student council

The Student Council is a body aimed at expressing and protecting the common interests of students and doctoral students studying at the Medical University of Plovdiv, regulated in the Higher Education Act. The Student Council consists of student and doctoral student representatives, chosen by elections. The Council has a mandate of two years and functions on the principles of voluntariness, equality, proportionality, independence, transparency, good faith, correctness and ethics. Its activity is regulated by the Regulations for the structure and activity of the Student Council at MU of Plovdiv and includes: participation of a representative in the National Representation of Student Councils; participation in determining the curricula, programs and structure of studied disciplines; participation in the maintenance of the quality of education; participation in determining the rules for the distribution of student scholarships, awards and grants; participation in the management of student dormitories; participation in the development of sports activities at the university; expressing an opinion on current issues at the university; creation of scientific student communities and publication of their scientific works; dissemination of information about upcoming events at the university and any other activity related to the rights, obligations and interests of students and doctoral students at the university.

Association of Medical Students - Plovdiv

The Association of Medical Students - Plovdiv (ASM-Plovdiv) is one of the six branches of the Association of Medical Students - Bulgaria (ASMB), as well as a member of the largest student organization that has ever existed in the world, the International Federation of Medical Students' Associations and is also a member of the prestigious EMSA - European Medical Students' Association.

ASM-Plovdiv is an association aiming at the unification of medical students at the Medical University of Plovdiv. At present there are over 450 members from all courses as well as already graduated doctors. ASM members organize and conduct campaigns aimed at socially significant issues and raising awareness. Protect and defend the rights of medical students. They carry out exchange internships with countries from all over the world in the best and leading medical universities. They organize and participate in national and international conferences on medicine, as well as implement European youth projects.

Bulgarian Association of Dental Medicine Students

BADMS is an association of dental students at the Bulgarian Dental Union. It works together with the Regional College in Plovdiv and participates in its activities. It aims to attend, organize and support events to stimulate scientific and social student activity, to protect and uphold the rights of students of dental medicine, and also assists in solving their educational and methodological problems. The efforts of BADMS are aimed at popularizing global innovations in dental science, as well as developing international educational activity and scientific exchange through communication with students and associations of dental students from other countries.

Bulgarian Association of Pharmacy Students

The Association of Pharmacy Students in Bulgaria is a non-governmental organization established in 2008 in Plovdiv with its headquarters at the Faculty of Pharmacy at the Medical University of Plovdiv.  Today, ASFB consists of nearly 130 members - pharmacy students from all years and already graduated master pharmacists. The activities carried out by BAPS include initiatives for: increasing educational qualifications and practical skills; supporting the professional realization and scientific development of pharmacy students in Bulgaria; conducting public health campaigns and charity events, trainings and lectures with representatives of the scientific and business environment; joint work with the Plovdiv Regional Pharmaceutical College; assistance for participation in internship and exchange programs; implementation of successful cooperation with the other associations of pharmacy in Sofia and Varna and with the associations of medicine and dentistry at the Medical University - Plovdiv; participation in the organization of Bulgarian Pharmaceutical Days.

Asclepius Youth Scientific Society

The society was founded in 1990 with the aim of stimulating the scientific activity of young teachers and students in various fields of medical science.

It is the successor of the student scientific society of HMI "I. P. Pavlov" and its dozens of workshops. The Society holds an annual conference for students and young scientists "Science and Youth", numerous practical seminars for students, supports international events for young scientists at the Union of Scientists - Plovdiv. Since 2005, the best scientific reports have been published in the eponymous Collected Papers, included in the National Reference List (NRL) of modern Bulgarian scientific publications (ID №2203;  (print)).

Doctor Honoris Causa

Other units

Library

The Library at the Medical University of Plovdiv  started its activity alongside the inauguration of the newly opened State University in Plovdiv in 1945. Today, the Library and Information Centre includes the central library and four branch libraries (in the Faculty of Dental Medicine, Base 1 in the "St. George" University Hospital, Medical College and in the Student Dormitories) and provides a wide range of services to over 4,000 users - Bulgarian and foreign students, interns, doctoral students, teachers, employees, and external users.

The library centre has a modern information technology infrastructure, equipment, and facilities. The functional library environment includes reading rooms, computer rooms, rooms for doctoral students, rooms for teamwork and a digitization studio.  The library branches have 375 seats, of which 75 are equipped with computers.

Library and information services are provided through an automated library system with integrated RFID technology, based on non-contact radio-frequency identification of objects. Since 2018, the modern system for the digitization of book collections - CopiBook Open System - has been operating. 

The library catalogue includes over 182,000 items (books, periodicals, and dissertations) on medicine, dental medicine, pharmacy and public health in Bulgarian and foreign languages. 8,090 of these resources are online journals, books and proceedings from licensed databases.

University press

Folia Medica

Folia Medica is a peer-reviewed interdisciplinary medical journal published every two months/bimonthly by the Medical University of Plovdiv in English. 

The first volume of 4 books was published in 1959 at the initiative of the then rector, Associate professor Dr. Todor Zahariev and Prof. Dr. Elisey Yanev, its first editor-in-chief. Its publication began as a supplement to the "Collection of works of the HMI". From 1974 until today, all articles in it are in English, and abstracts are in English and Russian.

The journal Folia Medica was included in the international numbering system used to identify publications in 1981 (volume XXIII)– International Standart Serial Number, with the issuance of serial numbers coordinated by the International ISSN Center in Paris.

On-line distribution of the journal, which grew into online publishing and online editing through the on-line Editorial Management Systems and on-line Submission Systems implemented in 2015 started in 2010.

Folia Medica is the only Bulgarian journal in English indexed in Index Medicus/MEDLINE  continuously since 1965.  Folia Medica has been referenced in the most prestigious international publishing databases, reference books and scientific information arrays since 1965. Folia Medica is the only Bulgarian medical scientific publication indexed and referenced continuously since 1964. 

Folia Medica publishes review articles, original scientific articles, short reports, case reports and letters to the editor. Folia Medica accepts manuscripts in the following fields: Medicine, Dental medicine, Pharmacy, Public Health and Healthcare. Priority topics include: integrative biology, experimental medicine, clinical and therapeutic aspects of socially significant diseases (cardiovascular diseases, cerebrovascular diseases, diabetes mellitus, neoplastic diseases, etc.).

University newspaper Auditoria Medica

Auditoria Medica is a periodical, printed and on electronic media, reflecting the academic, cultural, and social life at Medical University of Plovdiv. 

The first issue of Auditoria Medica was published in September 2012. The newspaper is a continuation of the university publication "Healthy Worker", which has been maintained for almost three decades thanks to the enthusiasm of the editors Dr. Hristo Bliznakov and Prof. Dr. Mr. Nikola Zapryanov and the technical assistant Angel Murhov.

The editorial team of Auditoria Medica is headed by the Rector of the university, and every issue has a "Rector's column".

The newspaper is in A4 format, usually with eight pages and circulation between 500 and 1000 copies. Photographs, design, pagination and proofreading are done by University staff.

The topics that found a place on the pages of the newspaper are information about the university, science, education, students, events, candidate campaign, sports, cultural performances, etc.

Cultural and social activity
 
Cultural and social activities at Medical University of Plovdiv  include the preparation and holding of a wide range of cultural and social events: creative meetings, exhibitions, competitions, seminars, lectures, conferences, etc.

Cultural and social activities are coordinated by an Expert Council, assisted by a CSA Board and led by an institutional coordinator. The Council and the Board assist in the development of independent university amateur groups, develop and implement projects in the field of cultural and historical heritage, support the publication of almanacs, catalogues, works of art, etc.

The main aim of Cultural and social activities is that the Medical University of Plovdiv turns into a territory of spirituality and culture, knowledge, and innovation, aimed at manifesting the talents of students, faculty and staff and stimulating the need for spiritual development.

Fulfilling the cultural and social policy, Medical University of Plovdiv cooperates with the local government, educational, cultural and social institutions and organizations and artists from the country and abroad.

Museums and exhibitions

Museum of Medicine - Medicine of the Thracian Lands Public Collection 
 

The exhibit traces the development of medicine as a practice, art, and science in the territory of Plovdiv and the region from ancient times to the present day. Since its opening in 2019, the Museum has been an integral part of the cultural and social activities of the Medical University of Plovdiv.

The museum exhibits are found in 4 exhibit units, gathered on a chronologically and thematically. The first unit covers the time from the emergence of the earliest settlement of the Three Hills during the Stone and Copper Age until the fall of the Roman Empire. The second covers the period of Plovdiv's existence within Byzantium, the First and Second Bulgarian States. The third unit includes exhibits related to medical practice from the period of Ottoman rule and the Renaissance. The fourth follows the history of medical care in Plovdiv during the War of Liberation and until the end of the 1940s. 

The Museum of Medicine actively partners with related regional and national scientific institutions, organizing joint exhibitions with the National Literary Museum, the Episcopal Basilica of Philippopolis, the National Anthropological Museum - IEMPM at the BAS, the Museum of History in Shumen, the Museum of History in Vratsa, the National Tourist Council, etc.

The Museum of Medicine pursues its mission to preserve the history and traditions of the Medical University of Plovdiv for the generations, since it is an inseparable part of the cultural heritage of our city and is also part of the annual tourist festival "Weekend in Plovdiv", organized by the Municipality of Plovdiv and the Tourist Council in Plovdiv.

Sport

Students play in the university's teams in aerobics, athletics, basketball, volleyball, cricket, football, swimming, court tennis and table tennis. 

During the year, MU of Plovdiv teams qualifies and participate in the National University Championship, National Summer Student Games "Summer University", University Winter Games "Winter University", international interuniversity tournaments such as the World InterUniversities Championship and EuroMilano.

An educational and sports camp for ski training is organized and held for the students during the winter break at the base of the Medical University of Plovdiv in Tsigov Chark,.

Sport facilities

The Medic Sports hall is located in the campus of Medical University of Plovdiv. The hall is suitable for volleyball, football, basketball, table tennis, court tennis and aerobics. It is intended for the groups of students in the university and for competitions. 

There are a basketball and volleyball court, two tennis courts, and a mini football field In the courtyard of the Medical College

There is a football field and basketball courts on the territory of the dormitories of the MU of Plovdiv on No. 2 Tsarevets Street for the students at the university to play sports,

Infrastructure and bases

Auditorium complex

The Auditorium complex  is one of the most modern and professionally equipped on the national scale. The building is designed by Dimitar Ahryanov and was opened in 2011. With its clean lines, glazed facade and modern silhouette, the building was nominated for building of the year for 2011 in the Culture category.

The auditorium complex has eight modern halls and three foyers. Equipped with multimedia projectors, laptops, screens, wireless microphones, whiteboards, laser pointers, the halls provide the opportunity to hold discussions, thematic discussions and organize workshops. The foyers have an area of 80 sq.m. each. Promotions, demonstrations, exhibitions, bazaars, cocktails, etc. can be organized in the same spaces.

In front of the building there is a well-designed park space with archaeological exhibits from the 1st-2nd century.

Rehabilitation bases
 
Medical University of Plovdiv has two rehabilitation centres - in the mountain resort of Tsigov Chark, between Velingrad and Batak, and on the Southern Black Sea coast, in the vicinity of the village of Velika.

The base in Tsigov Chark is used year-round by students, teachers and employees of MU of Plovdiv. It is suitable for organizing seminars and scientific conferences, a green school, etc., as well as for family celebrations and recreation.

Student dormitories
 
The dormitories of the Medical University of Plovdiv have a total of 1465 beds, distributed in three blocks. Block 1 and Block 2 are located at 2 "Tsarevets" Street, near the "St.Georgi" University General Hospital. Block 3 is located next to the Medical College building at 120 Buxton Brothers Blvd.

The rooms have two beds each with their own bathroom. Some of them are equipped with TVs. One of the most modern fire safety systems has been built. There is 24-hour video surveillance in the dormitories. Access is via magnetic cards. The dormitories offer free, high-speed Internet access to students in every room.

For the convenience of students, there are two reading rooms with 120 seats, two libraries, two student refectories with 350 seats, 2 sports grounds, a coffee shop, a recreation park, car parking, etc.

References

External links 
 Official website of Medical University – Plovdiv
 Official web page of Medical College at Medical University of Plovdiv
 University Directory - Medical University of Plovdiv
 Wikimapia - Medical University of Plovdiv

Universities in Plovdiv
Medical schools in Bulgaria
1945 establishments in Bulgaria